Glenns Run is a  long 2nd order tributary to the Ohio River in Ohio County, West Virginia.

Variant names
According to the Geographic Names Information System, it has also been known historically as:
Glens Run

Course
Glenns Run rises about 2 miles east of Wheeling, West Virginia, and then flows westerly to join the Ohio River in the Warwood neighborhood of Wheeling, West Virginia.

Watershed
Glenns Run drains  of area, receives about 40.2 in/year of precipitation, has a wetness index of 304.81, and is about 70% forested.

See also
List of rivers of West Virginia

References

Rivers of West Virginia
Rivers of Ohio County, West Virginia
Tributaries of the Ohio River